The Anglican Diocese of Sabongidda-Ora is one of 12 within the Anglican Province of Bendel, itself one of 14 provinces within the Church of Nigeria. The  current bishop is Augustine Ohilebo.

Notes

Church of Nigeria dioceses
Dioceses of the Province of Bendel